The 2020 Chinese Artistic Gymnastics Championships were held from September 23–28, 2020 in Zhaoqing, Guangdong. They were postponed from their original date in May due to the COVID-19 pandemic.

Women's medalists

Men's medalists

References

Chinese Artistic Gymnastics Championships
2020 in Chinese sport
Chinese Artistic Gymnastics Championships